BTR plc was a British multinational industrial conglomerate company headquartered in London, United Kingdom. It was founded in 1924, grew strongly by acquisitions under Sir Owen Green’s and later Alan Jackson’s leadership, which merged with Siebe plc in 1999 to form BTR Siebe plc, later renamed Invensys. BTR was listed on the London Stock Exchange and was once a constituent of the FTSE 100 Index during the 1980s and 1990s. Invensys was bought by and absorbed into Schneider Electric in 2014.

History

Early years
BTR started in 1924, when the B.F.Goodrich Company of the USA formed a UK subsidiary British Goodrich Rubber Co. Ltd.  In 1934 Goodrich sold most of its shares in the company, which changed its name to the British Tyre & Rubber Co. Ltd.

In 1956 the company changed its name to BTR Limited, when it ceased production of tyres.

Owen Green and subsequent years; acquisitive industrial group
The company was dominated by Sir Owen Green from 1967 to 1993 first as managing director (until 1986) and then as chairman. His focus was on operating margins and cash flow, arguably at the cost of long-term investment.

By 1982 BTR had acquired a large number of companies in the United Kingdom, the US, Canada, Australia, South Africa and Germany. BTR acquired the Thomas Tilling group in 1983, and Dunlop Holdings plc in 1985. The Dunlop road tyre business was immediately sold to Sumitomo Rubber Industries. In late 1985, BTR launched a hostile take-over bid for Pilkington, a leading manufacturer of high quality glass, with operations worldwide. After a successful defensive campaign by Pilkington, BTR was forced to withdraw its offer in early 1986.

BTR purchased Schlegel Corporation in late 1988 through a subsidiary. Schlegel had manufacturing facilities for door and window seals and related products in twelve countries.
Schlegel made automobile and building products in Europe through its subsidiaries Schlegel UK and Schlegel GmbH.
After the purchase BTR decided to transfer the Schlegel UK and Schlegel GmbH subsidiaries from Schlegel Corporation to itself. There was a dispute over how the transfer should be valued for tax purposes, with BTR valuing the Schlegel UK and Schlegel GmbH subsidiaries at $21,846,000 and $9,400,000, while the Internal Revenue Service valued them at $49,069,000 and $13,246,000.

During the early to mid 1990s under Alan Jackson’s stewardship, as CEO, BTR controlled over 1,500 subsidiary companies in over 60 different countries. This was mainly due to the takeover bids led by Green and later Jackson.

In 1992, Hawker Siddeley Group plc was acquired by BTR plc for £1.5bn. This was the first large hostile takeover of a company that Jackson had completed in his role as managing director. In that same year, he also purchased two smaller companies; Rockware, the UK’s leading class manufacturer and Pirreli, a sealing company. These were bought for A$400 and A$200 million respectively.

BTR also had an industrial products operation in Australia known as Nylex which it secured complete control of in 1995 by Jackson who was the chief executive officer at the time. This company during the late 1980s provided 41% of BTR’s profits and kickstarted BTR’s growth in the emerging markets of Southeast Asia. This was also due to the Malaysian wing of Nylex, Berhard.

One of the major ways BTR grew in size and in profits, was its continual takeover of other companies throughout the world. This led it to be a multinational conglomerate. Moreover, the company also gained further profits by investing large amounts of money in investing in capital and operations, as well as the methods used by Green and later Jackson, of ruthless cost-cutting. This included removing staff and also unprofitable businesses. It was these methods that led to the success of the company. Nevertheless, it also was perhaps it’s greatest weakness, which came ahead in the late 1990s following the retirement of both Green and Jackson, when debt rose to high levels. Restructuring failed to revive the company, in which, became increasingly inefficient and unprofitable in various manufacturing sections.

Later years
Between 1996 and 1998, BTR sold the remaining Dunlop companies.
In November 1997 UniPoly S.A, bought 32 companies from BTR, including the Schlegel Sealing and Shielding Group. 
The acquisition cost about $867 million.
The deal was a management buy-out in which UniPoly Group was formed to take over most of the rubber products business of BTR plc.
In these years BTR was organised in the following businesses areas: Engineering, Packaging, Materials, Building products, Polymers.

In 1999 BTR merged with Siebe to form BTR Siebe plc, which was renamed Invensys plc. The chief executive of BTR, Ian Strachan, also became the chief executive of Invensys following the merge with Siebe until 2000.

Company heads 
The company heads of BTR plc are only listed following the name change of BTR in 1956 until the takeover of BTR in 1999.

See also 
BTR Aerospace Group
Dunlop Rubber
India Rubber, Gutta Percha and Telegraph Cable Company
Nylex Plastics

References

External links
 

Conglomerate companies of the United Kingdom
Defunct manufacturing companies of the United Kingdom
Former defence companies of the United Kingdom
Conglomerate companies established in 1924
Manufacturing companies based in London
1924 establishments in the United Kingdom
Hawker Siddeley
Conglomerate companies disestablished in 1999
Manufacturing companies established in 1924
British companies established in 1924